18 Wheeler: American Pro Trucker, known in Japan as , is an arcade game developed by Sega AM2 and distributed by Sega. The game was released in arcades in 2000 and ported to the Dreamcast in 2001. It was released for the PlayStation 2 in 2001 and GameCube in 2002 by Acclaim Entertainment. Sega followed up on the success of 18 Wheeler with a sequel, The King of Route 66, which was released in the arcades in 2002 and ported to the PlayStation 2. This was one of the final arcade games to be ported to the Dreamcast after its discontinuation, before Sega became a third-party developer.

Gameplay

The main purpose of the game is to make it to the finish line with the truck's cargo. Players are given a set amount of time, but can ram into special vans that will add three seconds to the timer. There are several characters to choose from, each with a unique truck and attributes.

The game starts out in New York City, New York and players travel across the United States of America, ending in San Francisco, California. After Stage 1, the game gives the player a choice of trailer. One trailer is harder to haul, but provides a bigger payoff while the other choice is easier to haul but provides a smaller payoff. Money is deducted from the total when the trailer is hit. Players can sound the truck's horn to make other cars on the road yield and slipstream behind large vehicles to gain a momentary speed boost.

In addition to the time limit, players also compete with the "Lizard Tail", a rival trucker. Crossing the finish line before the Lizard Tail yields additional money. In between levels, players can park the truck in a minigame to earn more cash and upgrades for their truck, such as an improved horn.

Ports
The first port of the game was released on the Dreamcast. Released by Sega, it is faithful to its arcade counterpart, but the voice actors for the characters were changed and it lacks the arcade's cross-country map loading screens. One of the selectable truckers in the arcade version, Nippon Maru, was now made available as an unlockable character. A split screen multiplayer mode was added, allowing two players to race against each other. The game was released by Acclaim Entertainment (who also released Sega's Ferrari F355 Challenge on the Dreamcast) on the PlayStation 2 and Nintendo GameCube after Sega stopped making consoles and became a software based company.

Reception

The home versions of the game received "mixed or average reviews" according to the review aggregation website Metacritic. Rob Smolka of NextGen said that the Dreamcast version was "definitely worth a weekend rental, but its lack of online play and limited number of stages in the arcade game flatten its tires." In Japan, Famitsu gave the same console version 29 out of 40.

Also in Japan, Game Machine listed the arcade version in their March 15, 2000 issue as the second most-successful dedicated arcade game of the month. AllGame wrote that the same arcade version "does have a fairly thorough scoring system that some will take to, but it lacks the gameplay that great arcade titles such as Crazy Taxi possess. That isn't to say it's a bad game: it's beautiful to behold and will give you short term thrills, but it isn't one that you'll find yourself coming back to again and again after you've thrown down a couple of dollars playing it. In the end, it's a fun but short ride."

See also
Big Mutha Truckers
18 Wheels of Steel
American Truck Simulator
Crazy Taxi (video game)

References

External links

2000 video games
Acclaim Entertainment games
Arcade video games
Dreamcast games
GameCube games
PlayStation 2 games
Sega arcade games
Sega Games franchises
Sega video games
Sega-AM2 games
Truck racing video games
Multiplayer and single-player video games
Split-screen multiplayer games
Video games set in the United States
Video games developed in Japan